Carlos Tornero López de Lerma (born 7 October 1984) is a Spanish footballer who plays for Marbella FC as a defensive midfielder.

Club career
Born in San Vicente de Alcántara, Province of Badajoz, Extremadura, de Lerma began his career with CD Leganés, joining its youth system in 1995 at the age of 10. In 2005, he made his debut with the main squad in the Segunda División B, then continued his career at that level with Atlético Levante UD – being summoned by the first team for training but failing to appear in any official matches during his three-year stint – and AD Ceuta.

De Lerma became captain in his second season at Ceuta, but left in June 2010 after terminating his contract, signing with Albacete Balompié of Segunda División. He made his debut in the competition on 29 August, as a late substitute in a 1–1 home draw against AD Alcorcón.

On 20 July 2011, having appeared regularly with the Castile-La Mancha side (14 starts, 1,479 minutes of action) but suffering relegation, de Lerma returned to his first club Leganés. He was first choice in his only campaign, but they could only finish in 12th position.

On 26 June 2012, de Lerma signed a contract with Gimnàstic de Tarragona, recently relegated to the third tier. He made his competitive debut on 26 August, scoring the opening goal in an eventual 1–1 home draw with Valencia CF Mestalla.

De Lerma was released by Nàstic on 6 June 2013, joining FC Cartagena of the same league the following month.

References

External links

1984 births
Living people
People from Tierra de Badajoz
Sportspeople from the Province of Badajoz
Spanish footballers
Footballers from Extremadura
Association football midfielders
Segunda División players
Segunda División B players
Tercera División players
Tercera Federación players
CD Leganés B players
CD Leganés players
Atlético Levante UD players
AD Ceuta footballers
Albacete Balompié players
Gimnàstic de Tarragona footballers
FC Cartagena footballers
CD Toledo players
CD Alcoyano footballers
CD Móstoles URJC players
Hércules CF players
CD Ebro players
Marbella FC players